The 1928 Notre Dame Fighting Irish football team represented the University of Notre Dame during the 1928 college football season. Led by eleventh-year head coach Knute Rockne, the independent Irish compiled an uncharacteristic  record and were outscored 99 to 107.

In Cartier Field's final game on November 17, Notre Dame lost its first game on campus in 23 years, upset 27–7 by undefeated Carnegie Tech.

Schedule

References

Notre Dame
Notre Dame Fighting Irish football seasons
Notre Dame Fighting Irish football